Vladimir Vranić (November 10, 1896 – August 3, 1976) was a Croatian mathematician. He was one of the most renowned professors at the University of Zagreb. The amount of his scientific work was very large, and his most important work was in probability and statistics.

Vranić was Jewish, and during World War II, he was granted permission for freedom of residence and work by the "Directorate of the Ustaše Police" for the Jewish section.

References

Bibliography

 
 

1896 births
1976 deaths
Croatian Jews
Austro-Hungarian Jews
Croatian Austro-Hungarians
20th-century Croatian mathematicians
Faculty of Science, University of Zagreb alumni
Yugoslav mathematicians